A classical language is any language with an independent literary tradition and a large and ancient body of written literature. Classical languages are typically dead languages, or show a high degree of diglossia, as the spoken varieties of the language diverge further away from the classical written language over time.

Classical studies 

In the context of traditional European classical studies, the "classical languages" refer to Greek and Latin, which were the literary languages of the Mediterranean world in classical antiquity.

Greek was the language of Homer and of classical Athenian, Hellenistic and Byzantine historians, playwrights, and philosophers. It has contributed many words to the vocabulary of English and many other European languages, and has been a standard subject of study in Western educational institutions since the Renaissance. Latinized forms of Ancient Greek roots are used in many of the scientific names of species and in other scientific terminology. Koine Greek, which served as a lingua franca in the Eastern Roman Empire, remains in use today as a sacred language in some Eastern Orthodox churches.

Latin became the lingua franca of the early Roman Empire and later of the Western Roman Empire. Despite the decline of the Western Roman Empire, the Latin language continued to flourish in the very different social and economic environment of the Middle Ages, not least because it became the official language of the Roman Catholic Church. In Western and Central Europe and in parts of northern Africa, Latin retained its elevated status as the main vehicle of communication for the learned classes throughout the Middle Ages and subsequently; witness especially the Renaissance and Baroque periods. This language was not supplanted for scientific purposes until the 18th century, and for formal descriptions in zoology as well as botany it survived to the later 20th century. The modern international binomial nomenclature holds to this day: taxonomists assign a Latin or Latinized name as the scientific name of each species.

Outside of western civilization  

In terms of worldwide cultural importance, Edward Sapir in his book Language would extend the list to include Chinese, Arabic, and Sanskrit:

When we realize that an educated Japanese can hardly frame a single literary sentence without the use of Chinese resources, that to this day Siamese and Burmese and Cambodgian bear the unmistakable imprint of the Sanskrit and Pali that came in with Hindu Buddhism centuries ago, or that whether we argue for or against the teaching of Latin and Greek [in schools,] our argument is sure to be studded with words that have come to us from Rome and Athens, we get some indication of what early Chinese culture and Buddhism, and classical Mediterranean civilization have meant in the world's history. There are just five languages that have had an overwhelming significance as carriers of culture. They are classical Chinese, Sanskrit, Arabic, Greek, and Latin. In comparison with these, even such culturally important languages as Hebrew and French sink into a secondary position.

In this sense, a classical language is a language that has a broad influence over an extended period of time, even after it is no longer a colloquial mother tongue in its original form. If one language uses roots from another language to coin words (in the way that many European languages use Greek and Latin roots to devise new words such as "telephone", etc.), this is an indication that the second language is a classical language.

In comparison, living languages with a large sphere of influence are known as world languages.

General usage 

The following languages are generally taken to have a "classical" stage. Such a stage is limited in time and is considered "classical" if it comes to be regarded as a literary "golden age" retrospectively. Thus, Classical Greek is the language of 5th to 4th century BC Athens and, as such, only a small subset of the varieties of the Greek language as a whole. A "classical" period usually corresponds to a flowering of literature following an "archaic" period, such as Classical Latin succeeding Old Latin, Classical Sumerian succeeding Archaic Sumerian, Classical Sanskrit succeeding Vedic Sanskrit, Classical Persian succeeding Old Persian. This is partly a matter of terminology, and for example Old Chinese is taken to include rather than precede Classical Chinese. In some cases, such as those of Persian and Tamil, the "classical" stage corresponds to the earliest attested literary variant.

Antiquity
 Classical Sumerian (literary language of Sumer, c. 26th to 23rd centuries BC)
 Middle Egyptian (literary language of Ancient Egypt from c. the 20th century BC to the 4th century AD)
 Old Babylonian (the Akkadian language from c. 20th to 16th centuries BC, the imitated standard for later literary works)
 Middle Assyrian (the Akkadian language from c. 16th to 13th centuries BC)
 Vedic Sanskrit (the form of Sanskrit before Classical standardization was used in Vedic texts from c. 15th to 10th centuries BC)
 Classical Hebrew (the language of the Tanakh, in particular of the prophetic books of c. the 7th and 6th centuries BC)
 Old Persian (court language of the Achaemenid Empire, 6th to 4th centuries BC)
 Classical Chinese (based on the literary language, Yayan, used in the capital Luoyang of the Eastern Zhou Dynasty from c. the 5th century BC)
 Classical Greek (Attic dialect of the 5th century BC)
 Classical Sanskrit (described by Pāṇini's Ashtadhyayi of the 4th century BC)
 Classical Tamil (Sangam literature c. 2nd century BC to 2nd century AD, defined by Tolkāppiyam)
 Classical Pali (Buddhist Canon used this language from 2nd centuries BC)
 Classical Latin (literary language of the 1st century BC)
 Classical Mandaic (literary Aramaic of Mandaeism, 1st century AD)
 Classical Syriac (literary Aramaic of the Syriac Christianity,  3rd to 5th centuries)
 Middle Persian (court language of the Sassanid Empire, 3rd to 7th centuries)
 Classical Coptic (language of Egypt and the Coptic Orthodox Church of Alexandria, 3rd to 13th centuries, liturgical language to the present day)

Middle Ages
 Ge'ez (language of the Ethiopian Orthodox Tewahedo Church, the Garima Gospels are dated from the 5th century to the 10th century by various scholars)
 Classical Armenian (oldest attested form of Armenian from the 5th century and literary language until the 18th century)
 Classical Arabic (based on the language of the Qur'an, 7th century to present)
 Classical Kannada (court language of Rashtrakuta empire, earliest available literary work is the Kavirājamārga of 850 AD)
 Old Saxon (language of Saxon Christian literature, 9th to 12th centuries) 
 Old English (language of Beowulf and the Anglo-Saxon Chronicle with many divergent written dialects, but partially standardized in West Saxon form)
 Old French (language of Chivalric romance, 8th to 14th centuries)
 Old Georgian (language of Georgia, 5th to 11th centuries.)
 Old East Slavic (language of the Kievan Rus', 9th to 13th centuries)
 Angkorian Old Khmer (language of the Khmer Empire, 9th to 14th centuries)
 New Persian (language of classical Persian literature, 9th to present)
 Old Nubian (language of Nubia, 9th or 10th to 15th centuries)
 Old Javanese (language of Old Javanese literature, used primarily during Hindu-Buddhist Javanese kingdom era from 10th to 15th centuries)
 Old Bulgarian (language of the First Bulgarian Empire during its Golden Age, 10th century, earliest manuscript is Freising manuscripts)
 Classical Tibetan (religious and literary language of Tibet, 10th century to present)
 Classical Japanese (language of Heian period literature, 10th to 12th centuries)
 Middle Korean (language of Goryeo and Joseon, 10th to 16th centuries)
 Old Occitan (language of the troubadours, 11th to 14th centuries)
 Middle High German (language of Medieval German literature, 11th to 14th centuries)
 Old Serbian (language of Serbia before its conquest by the Ottoman Empire, 11th to 14th centuries)
 Classical Telugu (The earliest available literary work is the Telugu Mahabharata, 1067 AD)
 Classical Malayalam (The earliest extant prose work is the Ramacharitam, 12th century)
 Classical Odia (language of Odia literature, 12th to 18th centuries)
 Old Norse (language of the Viking Age, from the 12th century)
 Middle Bulgarian (language of the Second Bulgarian Empire, 12th to 15th centuries)
 Middle Low German (language of the Hanseatic League, 12th to 17th centuries)
 Old Uyghur (Turkic language which was spoken in Qocho from the 9th–14th centuries and in Gansu)
 Classical Icelandic (the language of the Icelandic sagas, 13th century)
 Classical Catalan (language of literature in the Crown of Aragon, 13th to 14th centuries)
 Classical Manding (language of the Mali Empire, 13th to 16th centuries) 
 Old Ruthenian (one language of the Grand Duchy of Lithuania, 13th to 16th centuries)
 Old Anatolian Turkish (11th to 15th centuries)
 Classical Ge'ez (language of Golden Age of Ge'ez literature, 13th to 16th centuries)
 Classical Irish or Classical Gaelic (language of the 13th to 18th centuries Scottish and Irish Gaelic literature)
 Classical Wolof (language of the Wolof Empire, 13th to 19th centuries)
 Middle English (language of The Canterbury Tales, 14th to 15th centuries, with many divergent written dialects, but partially standardized based on London speech)
 Middle French (language of the French Renaissance, 14th to 17th centuries)
 Classical Hungarian (language of Hungarian literature, 14th to 15th centuries)
 Classical Songhai (lingua franca of the Songhai Empire, 14th to 16th centuries)
 Early New High German (language of the Holy Roman Empire, the German Renaissance, and the Protestant Reformation, 14th to 17th centuries)
 Classical Malay (language of Maritime Southeast Asia, 14th to 18th centuries)
 Chagatai (classical Turkic language of Central Asia and the Volga, 14th to early 20th centuries)

Pre-Colonial Americas
 Classical Maya (the language of the mature Maya civilization, 3rd to 9th centuries)
 Classical Nahuatl (lingua franca of 16th-century central Mexico)
 Classical Quechua (lingua franca of the 16th-century Inca Empire)
 Classical Kʼicheʼ (a Mayan language of 16th-century Guatemala)
 Classical Tupi (language of 16th to 18th centuries Brazil)

Early modern period

 Awadhi (lingua franca of Northern India during Mughal rule led to its use by poets, 14th to 18th centuries)
 Renaissance Italian (language of the Italian Renaissance, 15th to 16th centuries)
 Late Old Portuguese (language of Portuguese Golden Age, 15th to 16th centuries)
 Early Modern Spanish (language of the Spanish Golden Age, 15th to 17th centuries)
 Classical Azeri (lingua franca of the Caucasus Mountain region and language of Azeri literature, 15th to 18th centuries)
 Classical Danish (lingua franca of the Kalmar Union and Denmark-Norway from the 15th to the 19th centuries and language of Danish literature from the 16th to the 19th centuries)
 Old Lithuanian (the other language of the Grand Duchy of Lithuania, 16th to 17th centuries)
 Early Modern English (language of King James Bible and Shakespeare, 16th to 17th centuries)
 Middle Polish (language of the Polish Golden Age, 16th to 18th centuries)
 Classical Ottoman Turkish (language of poetry and administration of the Ottoman Empire, 16th to 19th centuries)
 Manchu language (language of the Manchus who ruled China, 16th–20th centuries)
 Early Modern Dutch (language of the Dutch Golden Age, 17th century)
 Early Modern French (language of France under Louis XIV to Napoleon, 17th to 18th centuries)
 Classical Ladino (language of Sephardic Jewish literature, 17th to 19th centuries)
 Classical Russian (language of the Russian Empire, 18th to 19th centuries)
 Classical Mongolian language (the language of Mongolian literature and translations of Tibetan Buddhist religious texts from 1700–1900)
 Sadhu Bhasha (the modern language Bengali from 1820s to 1940s)
 Classical Yiddish (language of the Yiddish Renaissance, 19th–20th centuries)
 Classical Newari (language of Malla kingdom and lingua franca in India-Tibet trade)

See also 

Ancient language
Aureation, an aspect of the influence of a classical language on a later language
Classical languages of India
Classicism
Classics
Golden age (metaphor)
Lingua franca
List of lingua francas
List of languages by first written accounts
Literary language
Sacred language
Official language
Standard language
World language

References

Further reading
Ashdowne, Richard. 2009. "Accidence and Acronyms: Deploying electronic assessment in support of classical language teaching in a university context." Arts and Humanities in Higher Education 8, no. 2: 201–16.
Beach, Adam R. 2001. "The creation of a classical language in the eighteenth century: standardizing English, cultural imperialism, and the future of the literary canon." Texas Studies in Literature and Language 43, no. 2: 117+.
Coulson, Michael. 1976. Sanskrit: An Introduction to the Classical Language. Sevenoaks, Kent: Hodder and Stoughton.
Crooker, Jill M., and Kathleen A. Rabiteau. 2000. "An interwoven fabric: The AP latin examinations, the SAT II: Latin test, and the national "standards for classical language learning." The Classical Outlook 77, no. 4: 148–53.
Denizot, Camille, and Olga Spevak. 2017. Pragmatic Approaches to Latin and Ancient Greek. Philadelphia: John Benjamins Publishing Company.
Eschbach-Szabo, Viktoria, and Shelley Ching-yu Hsieh. 2005. "Chinese as a classical language of botanical science: Semiotics of transcription." Kodikas/Code. Ars Semeiotica: An International Journal of Semiotics 28, nos. 3–4: 317–43.
Gruber-Miller, John. 2006. When Dead Tongues Speak: Teaching Beginning Greek and Latin. Oxford: Oxford University Press.
Hymes, Robert. 2006. "Getting the Words Right: Speech, Vernacular Language, and Classical Language in Song Neo-Confucian 'Records of Words'." Journal of Song-Yuan Studies 36: 25–55. https://www.jstor.org/stable/23496297.
Koutropoulos, Apostolos. 2011. "Modernizing classical language education: communicative language teaching & educational technology integration in classical Greek." Human Architecture: Journal of the Sociology of Self-Knowledge 9, no. 3 (2011): 55–69.
Tieken, Herman. 2010. "Blaming the Brahmins: Texts lost and found in Tamil literary history." Studies in History 26, no. 2: 227–43.
Watt, Jonathan M. 2003. "Classical language instruction: A window to cultural diversity." International Journal of Diversity in Organisations, Communities, and Nations 3: 115–24.
Whitney, William Dwight. 1971. Sanskrit Grammar: Including Both the Classical Language, and the Older Dialects, of Veda and Brahmana. 12th issue of the 2nd ed. Cambridge, MA: Harvard University Press.

External links